Mya Bollaers is a Belgian actress.

Career 
She rose to prominence with her title role in the 2019 film Lola (Lola vers la mer), in which she played a 18-year-old transgender girl grieving the death of her mother. Her portrayal received general acclaim from film critics, resulting in numerous accolades. At the 10th Magritte Awards, Lola received seven nominations and won two, including Most Promising Actress for Bollaers, becoming the first openly transgender person to be nominated for a Magritte Award.

At the 45th César Awards, Bollaers was selected to compete for the César Award for Most Promising Actress.

Filmography

References

External links

1996 births
21st-century Belgian actresses
Belgian film actresses
Magritte Award winners
Belgian LGBT actors
Living people
Actors from Liège
Transgender actresses